William Archibald Geddes was an Anglican priest in the mid 20th century.

He was born in the Magdalen Islands on 18 February 1894 and educated at Dalhousie University. He served in the Great War as a gunner in the 8th Canadian Siege Battery. He was ordained in 1920 as a missionary to the Eskimo at Herschel Island. He was appointed Archdeacon of Yukon in 1927  and the next year became Bishop of Mackenzie River, a post he held for 5 years. In 1934 he was translated to Yukon. He died in post on 16 April 1947.

References

1894 births
1947 deaths
People from Gaspésie–Îles-de-la-Madeleine
Dalhousie University alumni
Anglican archdeacons in North America
Anglican bishops of Mackenzie River
Anglican bishops of Yukon
20th-century Anglican Church of Canada bishops